Bái Đính Temple (Chữ Hán: 沛嵿寺) or Bái Đính Temple Spiritual and Cultural Complex is a complex of Buddhist temples on Bái Đính Mountain in Gia Viễn District, Ninh Bình Province, Vietnam. The compound consists of the original old temple and a newly created larger temple. It is considered the largest complex of Buddhist temples in Vietnam and has become a popular site for Buddhist pilgrimages from across Vietnam.

Bái Đính Temple, along with Phát Diệm Cathedral, Hoa Lư Ancient Capital Tam Cốc-Bích Động, Tràng An, Cúc Phương is a famous tourist attraction site of Ninh Bình Province.

New complex
The New Bai Đính Temple (Bái Đính Tân Tự) encompasses an area of 700 hectares, located on Ba Rau hills, near the Hoàng Long River. This is a large complex which includes many structures built over several phases starting in 2003 and finally completed in 2010. The temple's architecture follows traditional lines, consisting of large halls, courtyards and enclosures. The huge scale of Bai Dinh makes it strikingly different from previously built Vietnamese Buddhist pagodas, however. The largest structure, the Tam Thế Hall, rises to 34 m at its roof ridge and measures over 59 m in length. The construction materials include locally quarried stone and timber from Ninh Bình and tiles from Bát Tràng (reinforced concrete was also employed owing to the scale of construction). The temple adheres to traditional Vietnamese design aesthetics with its curve finials and corner eaves soaring outward and upward, resembling a phoenix's tail. Artisanal works from local handicraft villages were selected for the interior, with bronze sculptures from Ý Yên, stone carvings from Ninh Van, wood carpentry from Phú Lộc, and embroidery from Ninh Hải.

Old temple
The original Bái Đính temple is located in the foothills some 800 meters from the new temple. Ascending a series of over 300 stone steps, the path passes under an ornamental gate to reach the entrance. The temple itself is located in a series of small caves on the mountainside. Along with Buddhist deities, natural spirits of the mountains are also venerated.

Bái Đính Temple festival
Bái Đính temple hosts a large festival on the sixth day of the first lunar month drawing huge crowds. Buddhist rites are performed in the New Temple in conjunction with traditional rituals from the Old Temple.

Records of Vietnam
Bái Đính Temple (Gia Sinh commune, Gia Viễn district, Ninh Bình province) is the largest temple in Vietnam nowadays. The temple covers an area of 539ha, including 27ha ancient temple area, 80ha new temple area. Bái Đính is holding many records of Vietnam, Southeast Asia, Asia. Looking at the height of 100m, the panorama of the pagoda is taken into view with incredible beauty.

Photos of Bái Đính Temple

References

External links
 Bái Đính Temple(in Vietnamese)

Buddhist temples in Vietnam
Buildings and structures in Ninh Bình province
Tourist attractions in Ninh Bình province